The 2017 Pacific typhoon season was a below-average season in terms of accumulated cyclone energy and the number of typhoons and super typhoons, and the first since the 1977 season to not produce a Category 5-equivalent typhoon on the Saffir–Simpson scale. The season produced a total of 27 named storms, 11 typhoons, and only two super typhoons, making it an average season in terms of storm numbers. It was an event in the annual cycle of tropical cyclone formation, in which tropical cyclones form in the western Pacific Ocean. The season runs throughout 2017, though most tropical cyclones typically develop between May and October. The season's first named storm, Muifa, developed on April 25, while the season's last named storm, Tembin, dissipated on December 26. This season also featured the latest occurrence of the first typhoon of the year since 1998, with Noru reaching this intensity on July 23.

The scope of this article is limited to the Pacific Ocean, to the north of the equator between 100°E and the 180th meridian. Within the northwestern Pacific Ocean, there are two separate agencies that assign names to tropical cyclones, which can often result in a cyclone having two names. The Japan Meteorological Agency (JMA) will name a tropical cyclone should it be judged to have 10-minute sustained wind speeds of at least  anywhere in the basin. PAGASA assigns unofficial names to tropical cyclones which move into or form as a tropical depression in their area of responsibility, located between 115°E–135°E and between 5°N–25°N, regardless of whether or not a tropical cyclone has already been given a name by the JMA. Tropical depressions that are monitored by the United States' Joint Typhoon Warning Center (JTWC) are given a numerical designation with a "W" suffix.


Seasonal forecast

During the year, several national meteorological services and scientific agencies forecast how many tropical cyclones, tropical storms, and typhoons will form during a season and/or how many tropical cyclones will affect a particular country. These agencies include the Tropical Storm Risk (TSR) Consortium of University College London, PAGASA and Taiwan's Central Weather Bureau. The first forecast of the year was released by PAGASA during January 20, within its seasonal climate outlook for the period January–June. The outlook noted that one to two tropical cyclones were expected between January and March, while two to four were expected to develop or enter the Philippine Area of Responsibility between April and June. During March 23, the Hong Kong Observatory predicted that the tropical cyclone season in Hong Kong would be near-normal, with four to seven tropical cyclones coming within  of the territory, compared to an average of six, which was revised to six to nine tropical cyclones in August.

On May 5, Tropical Storm Risk (TSR) issued their first forecast for the season, anticipating an activity of slightly above normal with 27 named storms, 17 typhoons and 10 intense typhoons, including an accumulated cyclone energy (ACE) of 357. On June 26, Taiwan's Central Weather Bureau (CWB) predicted a normal season with 21–25 tropical storms developing over the basin, while three — five systems were expected to affect Taiwan itself. On the same day, the Thai Meteorological Department (TMD) predicted that 2 tropical cyclones would move towards the northern or northeastern parts of Thailand during August or September. On July 6, TSR released their second forecast for the season, reducing the predicted numbers to 25 named storms, 15 typhoons, and 7 intense typhoons, with an ACE Index of 250. During the same day, the PAGASA issued their second and final outlook for the season for the period of July–December, where six to nine tropical cyclones were expected to develop or entered their area of responsibility between July and September, while three to five were forecast during October to December. During August 8, the TSR released their third and final forecast for the season, slightly raising their forecast named storms to 26, with 14 reaching typhoon intensity and 7 reaching intense typhoon intensity. ACE Indices were slightly raised to 255.

Season summary

The first half of the season was relatively inactive, with only seven systems developing, of which only two intensified into tropical storms. The first system of 2017 developed on January 7, and was named Auring by PAGASA. Tropical Depression Bising developed during the first week of February, and was a factor in, and worsened the effects of, the 2017 Visayas and Mindanao floods. This was followed by Crising, the third system unofficially named by PAGASA. Heavy rains from the depression caused flooding that led to the deaths of 10 people in Cebu, Philippines. Shortly after the dissipation of Crising came the formation of the first tropical storm of the season — Muifa. The system was not strong, however, and was located away from all major land areas, so it caused no damage. No systems formed during the month of May, the first such occurrence since 2013. The next cyclone, Merbok, formed during mid-June, and made landfall in Shenzhen in China. Nanmadol passed over the Ryukyu Islands and progressed to make landfall in Nagasaki on Japan's island of Kyushu during early July. Torrential rainfall and strong winds from the cyclone itself and from the stormy weather that persisted for a number of days were responsible for major damage and 41 fatalities across mainland Japan.

By the middle of July, tropical activity had increased with simultaneous tropical storms developing after July 14. Severe Tropical Storm Talas formed during mid-July near the Paracel Islands in the South China Sea, and traveled generally westwards. It made landfall in Vietnam after brushing China's Hainan province and, unusually, continued to track far inland to the Laos–Thailand border before weakening to a depression. At least 14 deaths were attributed to the storm, primarily as a result of flooding. Later, the season was very active with 7 storms in late July-early August. Typhoon Noru reached Category 4 super typhoon in peak intensity and made landfall in Japan, causing $100 million in damage. Tropical Storm Sonca made landfall in Quảng Trị, Vietnam; 2017 was the first year since 1971 where 2 storms made landfall in Central Vietnam in July. Sonca brought heavy rainfall in Northeast Thailand and caused extreme flooding in the region with estimated costs of over US$300 million. Typhoon Nesat and Tropical storm Haitang made landfall in Taiwan and Fujian (a province in China), respectively, 2 days apart. In mid-late August, Typhoon Hato and Tropical Storm Pakhar made landfall in Macau and Guangdong respectively while they were at peak intensity. So far Typhoon Hato is the costliest tropical cyclone in Northwest Pacific in 2017 with damages totalling $6.82 billion.

The season was weaker in September. Typhoon Talim made landfall in Japan as a minimal typhoon and caused US$700 million in damage. Typhoon Doksuri made landfall in Quảng Bình, Vietnam as a Category 3 typhoon; damage was very major as the total was estimated at over US$814 million. In early October a tropical depression made landfall in Northern and North Central Vietnam, which brought very heavy rainfall and was responsible for the worst flooding in Northern and North-Central Vietnam, with 109 deaths and total damages of over US$570 million. Later, Typhoon Khanun made landfall in Southern China. So far Typhoon Lan has been the strongest tropical cyclone in the basin in 2017, and became the second largest tropical cyclone on record.

In November, La Niña was returned and tropical activity had increased with simultaneous tropical storms developing, and most of them moved west and affected Philippines and Vietnam. Typhoon Damrey made landfall in Khánh Hòa, Vietnam and became one of the costliest typhoon in Vietnamese history since 1975; and it is one of the costliest and deadliest typhoon in the basin in 2017 with total damage reached US$1.03 billion and 151 deaths. Later, two weak storms affected Philippines. In December, Tropical storm Kai-tak caused flooding in Central Philippines. Typhoon Tembin was responsible for severe flooding and landslides in South Philippines, it became the deadliest tropical cyclone in 2017 with over 250 deaths. Typhoon Tembin moved South into the China Sea, so 2017 became the most active tropical cyclone season in the South China Sea with 22 Tropical cyclones, and Tembin affected Southern Vietnam.

Systems

Tropical Depression 01W (Auring)

During that day, the system moved along the southern periphery of a subtropical ridge of high pressure, before the JTWC initiated advisories on the system and designated it as Tropical Depression 01W. It later made landfall in the Philippines the next day, and was assessed to have degenerated into a remnant low by the JTWC. By January 15, the JTWC re-issued advisories as it was located to the east of Vietnam. However, convection dissipated due to wind shear and land interaction, the JTWC issued their final warnings on January 16.

Flooding from Auring killed a total of 11 people. Damages from Tropical Depression Auring were totaled at ₱7.14 million (US$144,000) from agriculture and fishing in Negros Occidental.

Tropical Depression Bising

On February 3, a tropical depression developed near Palau. The PAGASA would later name it as "Bising" as the depression was present at the Philippine Area of Responsibility. The storm would meander around the Philippine Sea, until the depression started to weaken when its LLCC became exposed, while moving north-northeast. The agency would not notice its weakening until the next day, when they issued their last advisory.

Tropical Depression 02W (Crising)

A tropical depression formed over Palau on April 13. On the next day, the JTWC designated the depression as "02W"; on the best track, the depression was a remnant low at this time. Hours later, the PAGASA would name it "Crising" as the depression was present at the Philippine Area of Responsibility. The depression would later shrink its size while approaching the Visayas region. On the following day, the agency reported that "Crising" slightly intensified while moving near the Samar provinces; the intensification of the storm would prove only momentarily and weakened again. The JTWC would later discontinue advisories on the storm; on its best track, the system remained as a disturbance. The PAGASA discontinued the advisories on the system as it was nearing landfall on 13:00 UTC (9:00 pm PHST) over Hernani, Eastern Samar. The remnants of the depression crossed the region and into the South China Sea. At 18:00 UTC on April 18, the JTWC would upgrade the disturbance as 02W; operationally, the system was kept as a disturbance. The status would be short-lived, as the JTWC declared 02W as a disturbance. The remnants would later linger around, dissipating on April 20, while in the Luzon Strait.

As of April 17, at least ten people were reported to be killed in Cebu by flooding caused by the system. Total damages throughout the Philippines reached ₱84.8 million (US$1.7 million), mostly from Danao, Cebu.

Tropical Storm Muifa (Dante)

During April 22, the JMA started to monitor a tropical depression that had developed near Guam. After moving westward for a couple of days, the JTWC began issuing advisories, and designated the storm 03W. By April 25, 03W organized and began consolidating further as the JMA upgraded the depression to a tropical storm, giving it the name Muifa. Muifa entered the Philippine Area of Responsibility the following day, and was named Dante by PAGASA. The storm, however, started moving northwards and immediately tracked out of the area by April 27. Following this, both the JMA and the JTWC downgraded Muifa to a tropical depression. Muifa fully dissipated early on April 29, and the JMA issued their final advisory on the storm.

Severe Tropical Storm Merbok

On June 10, the JMA started to track a tropical depression to the west of Manila, Philippines. A few hours later, 04W had intensified into a tropical storm, receiving the name Merbok as it starts to move in a north-northwestward direction. On June 13, the JMA issued its final warning on Merbok, as the system dissipated over China.

Across Guangdong Province, 32 homes were destroyed, 122,000 people reported property damage, and 13,000 hectares of crops flooded. Total economic losses in South China were counted to be CN¥600 million (US$88.3 million).

Severe Tropical Storm Nanmadol (Emong)

On July 1, the JMA upgraded a low-pressure area it had been monitoring to a tropical depression, located south-southwest of Okinotorishima. Shortly thereafter, the PAGASA classified the system as a tropical depression, assigning the local name Emong. On July 2, the JMA classified the system as a tropical storm, and assigned the official name Nanmadol. The JTWC followed suit and gave the internal designation of 05W. The cyclone continued to intensify, and was upgraded by the JMA to a severe tropical storm later that day. Nanmadol reached peak intensity at about 06:00 UTC on July 3, and maintained this strength until making landfall on the western coast of Kyushu several hours later. The cyclone began to accelerate while following a generally eastward course across the south of Japan. After brushing the southern coast of Japan, the JTWC issued its final advisory during the next day. The JMA followed suit late on July 4, when it had become extratropical. Its remnants moved out of the basin three days later.

At least three people were injured during the storm—a young boy's hand was injured when a school window broke in the city of Kumamoto, and two adults in Ōita prefecture sustained minor injuries after falling due to the strong winds. A total of 41 people have been confirmed dead due to torrential rains which caused landslides and flooding, particularly in Kyushu. Total damages from the storm in Japan were amounted to be US$1.68 billion.

Severe Tropical Storm Talas

Early on July 14, the JMA upgraded a low-pressure area in the South China Sea to a tropical depression after the system began to organize. Late the same day, the JMA began issuing advisories on the depression, and forecast it to develop into a tropical storm within the next 24 hours. The system intensified into a tropical storm, and was then named Talas. A few days later, Talas intensified further to become a severe tropical storm.

Talas made landfall near Vinh of Nghệ An Province in Central Vietnam at 01:00 ICT on July 17 (18:00 UTC on July 16) as a severe tropical storm. In Vietnam, the storm left 14 people dead and damaged around 2,700 houses. A coal ship with 13 crew members sank off the coast of Cửa Lò, leaving 3 dead and another 3 still unaccounted for. Damages in Vietnam were counted to be 993 billion₫ (US$43.7 million). Total economic losses in Hainan Province reached CNY 60 million (US$8.8 million).

Typhoon Noru

The JMA reported that a non-tropical low had transitioned into a tropical depression north-northwest of Wake Island early on July 19. Twelve hours later it had strengthened to a tropical storm, and was named Noru. Noru then interacted with Tropical Storm Kulap, its counterpart storm, and began to exhibit a fujiwhara effect with Kulap. Tropical Storm Kulap then weakened enough, and when it dissipated, its remnants started to power Noru, and it became a severe tropical storm after, and continued its long and erratic journey towards Japan.

About halfway through July 22, the system became the first typhoon of the season, and fluctuations in intensity occurred until late on July 29, when it slowed down, and shortly thereafter, explosive intensification ensued, and Noru intensified into a Category 4 super typhoon. After it reached peak intensity, it quickly began to weaken for a short period of time before slowing the rate of weakening. It briefly accelerated, before yet again, it begun to stall near Japan for some time before moving north and dissipating in the Sea of Japan. Total economic losses in Japan were counted to be US$100 million.

Tropical Storm Kulap

On July 20, the JMA started to monitor a tropical depression that formed over to the southwest of Midway Atoll, just to the west of the International Date Line. The JTWC classified the system as subtropical, however. By July 21, the subtropical storm started to show tropical characteristics, where it prompted both agencies to start issuing advisories, receiving the designation of 09W and the name Kulap. During the next day, Kulap briefly reached its peak intensity with 1-minute sustained winds of  after imagery depicted some convection over near its compact center. After moving westward in a marginally favorable environment, the JMA had reported a minimum pressure of 1002 hPa with peak 10-minute winds of  during the early hours of July 24. Due to strong shear and an interaction with Typhoon Noru to its south, Kulap had rapidly weakened; therefore, both agencies issued their final advisory on July 26. The JMA, however, tracked Kulap's remnants until July 28 when it was absorbed by the outflow of Typhoon Noru.

Tropical Storm Sonca

After moving westward for a couple of days, the system strengthened into a tropical storm by both agencies while nearing the island province of Hainan, receiving the name Sonca. By July 24, Sonca reached its maximum intensity with a minimum pressure of 994 hPa. Early on July 25, the JTWC issued its final advisory as the system made landfall over in Quảng Trị Province, Vietnam. The JMA issued its final advisory a few hours later when it had weakened into a tropical depression, although Sonca maintained its intensity over land until it had fully dissipated on July 29.

Flooding in Northern Cambodia drowned two people, blocked many roads and flooded several hundred houses. Damage across Sakon Nakhon, Thailand exceeded 100 million baht (US$3 million) and killed 23 people across Thailand.

Tropical Storm Roke (Fabian)

The JMA noted the formation of a tropical depression southeast of Taiwan early on July 21. Assigning the numerical designation 10W, the JTWC upgraded the system to a tropical depression at about 18:00 UTC the same day. The system traveled in a generally northwesterly direction, and passed through the Luzon Strait, between Taiwan and the Philippines. Around the same time, the PAGASA began issuing advisories on the depression, and contributed the unofficial name Fabian. Early the next day, after the system had emerged into the South China Sea, both the JMA and the JTWC upgraded the system to a tropical storm, naming it Roke. Roke assumed a more westerly course, and tracked obliquely towards China's Guangdong coast. The JTWC downgraded the system to a tropical depression just 12 hours later, at 18:00 UTC, but the JMA maintained the cyclone's category as a tropical storm. Roke made landfall just east of the Hong Kong central business district at about 01:30 UTC on July 23, and passed over Shenzhen one to two hours later. Roke weakened to a depression a few hours later, though the JMA declared that it had dissipated on 18:00 UTC of the same day.

Schools, businesses and government offices were closed in Hong Kong as the Hong Kong Observatory (HKO) raised its typhoon warning signal to 8—the third highest of five levels—in preparation for Tropical Storm Roke. Ferry services in the city were suspended, and more than 50 flights were delayed. However, winds in the city were relatively light and no significant damage was reported.

Typhoon Nesat (Gorio)

The JMA upgraded a low-pressure area to a tropical depression east of the Philippines early on July 25. On July 26, it was named Gorio by PAGASA and later intensified into Tropical Storm Nesat. Nesat stalled in the Philippine Sea in the next couple of days and gradually intensified to become a severe tropical storm on July 27. It gradually strengthened until its peak on July 29, as a Category 1 typhoon. It then hit Taiwan, and began to weaken until its dissipation on July 30.

Despite the storm not making landfall in the Philippines, Nesat enhanced the southwest monsoon which brought torrential rainfall over most of the country. As of August 3, the NDRRMC had reported a total of ₱ 247.58 million (US$4.9 million) worth of damages. Total damages in Taiwan were counted to be NT$60.19 million (US$2.03 million). Total damages in Mainland China were counted to be CNY 1.83 billion (US$271.6 million).
Typhoon Nesat was originally a Category 1, but was upgraded by the Joint Typhoon Warning Center into a minimal Category 2.

Tropical Storm Haitang (Huaning)

A low-pressure area over the northern portion of the South China Sea was upgraded to a tropical depression by the JMA early on July 27. Despite an exposed LLCC with disorganized banding, the JTWC started initiating advisories, assigning the designation of 12W. During the next day, the system had strengthened into a tropical storm, with the JMA naming it as Haitang, after ASCAT image depicted 40 knot winds over in the southern portion of the storm. Around the same time, Haitang entered the Philippine area of Responsibility, receiving the name Huaning by PAGASA, although the system had left the area during 12:00 UTC of the same day. Three hours later, the JTWC downgraded the system to a tropical depression, though it was re-upgraded into a tropical storm six hours later. By July 31, the JTWC issued their final advisory on Haitang after the system had made landfall over in the Pingtan County in Taiwan. During 06:00 UTC of that day, the JMA issued their final advisory after Haitang weakened into a remnant low.

Tropical Storm Nalgae

During the next day, the JTWC started issuing advisories and designated it as 13W. By August 2, both agencies upgraded 13W to Tropical Storm Nalgae after imagery showed flaring convection and the storm was located in a region of low to moderate wind shear and warm SSTs. Moving in a northward direction, Nalgae slowly intensified for several days. The JTWC downgraded Nalgae to a tropical depression later that day and issued their final advisory after the storm was located in very unfavorable environments.

Typhoon Banyan

Typhoon Hato (Isang)

A low-pressure area developed into a tropical depression on August 19, while located to the southeast of Taiwan, and was named by PAGASA as Tropical Depression Isang. Over the next few days, Isang became a tropical storm, and was named Hato. Hato then became a severe tropical storm as it passed through the Batanes region of the Philippines, and the PAGASA later issued its final warning as Hato (named Isang) moved out of the Philippine Area of Responsibility.

It gradually intensified and reached typhoon status on the afternoon of August 22 after entering the northeastern part of the South China Sea.
On August 23, 07:00 HKT, Hato was approximately 100 km southeast of Hong Kong, bringing rain to the mainland as well as Hainan to the west. At 11:00 HKT the eye was approximately 60 km southwest of Hong Kong with the typhoon heading onto the mainland in a west-northwesterly direction.

Hong Kong Observatory issued Hurricane Signal No. 10 at 09:10 HKT, August 23, the first time since 2012. A total of 11 people were killed while total damage in Mainland China were counted to CN¥28.91 billion (US$4.34 billion). No people were killed in Hong Kong, while estimated damage in Hong Kong amounted to HK$4 billion (US$511 million). In Macau, losses of 12.50 billion patacas (US$1.55 billion) were incurred when high tides exacerbated flooding in most of the low-lying areas, inundating ground floor shops and businesses. There were 12 deaths as a result of the typhoon, including a number of people who drowned in flooded underground car-parks. Despite making landfall in South China, Hato triggered floods in northern Vietnam and killed 1 person. The total damage by heavy rainfall in Bắc Kạn Province was 31 billion₫ (US$1.36 million). In total, there were 24 deaths attributed to the typhoon.

Severe Tropical Storm Pakhar (Jolina)

On August 24, a tropical depression formed in the Philippine Sea and was named Jolina by PAGASA. On the next day, Jolina intensified into a tropical storm, and was named Pakhar. On August 26, Pakhar passed over the Philippines heading westward toward mainland China where it gathered strength into a severe tropical storm before making landfall in Tianshan on August 27, where after the previous monster storm Typhoon Hato hit days ago, they raised Signal #8 for Pakhar's arrival and landfall. Pakhar rapidly dissipated the next day.

Total economic losses in South China amounted to CN¥760 million (US$114.4 million) while a total of twelve people were killed in relation to the storm. Moreover, damages in the Philippines were recorded at ₱41.27 million (US$808 thousand) and 2 billion₫ (US$88,000) in Vietnam.

Typhoon Sanvu

The JTWC followed suit on the following day, designating the system as 17W. Around the same time, the system had intensified into Tropical Storm Sanvu. By August 29, Sanvu increased in size, and therefore it prompted the JMA to upgrade it to a severe tropical storm. After moving in a westward direction, Sanvu stalled and entered a region of favorable conditions. As a ragged eye developed, both agencies upgraded Sanvu to a typhoon during August 31. Sanvu reached its peak intensity on September 1 as a Category 2 typhoon. Thereafter, the system steadily weakened as it started to move northwards with JTWC immediately downgrading the system to a tropical storm and issuing their final advisory late on September 2. The JMA still classified Sanvu as a typhoon until they issued their final advisory as the system had transitioned into an extratropical cyclone on September 3.

Sanvu did not cause any significant damage in the Northern Mariana Islands, though a 33-year-old woman drowned at Obyan beach in Saipan due to large waves on August 29.

Severe Tropical Storm Mawar

On August 30, the JMA started to track a tropical depression to the north-northeast of Luzon, Philippines. Given the international designation of 18W by the JTWC, the JMA upgraded the system immediately to Tropical Storm Mawar. Slowly organizing, convection had rapidly developed and Mawar strengthened into a severe tropical storm early on September 2. On September 3, Mawar had weakened to a tropical storm after environments started to become unfavorable due to high wind shear. Later that day, Mawar weakened to a tropical depression and the JTWC issued their final advisory while making landfall over in Southeastern China between the cities of Shanwei and Shantou. The JMA followed suit early on September 4 when Mawar had fully dissipated.

The China's National Meteorological Center (NMC) issued a blue alert for the southern parts of Guangdong on September 1. During 2:00 a.m. local time on September 2, the Hong Kong Observatory issued a Tropical Cyclone Warning Signal No. 1 over in Hong Kong. Chinese authorities activated a natural disaster alert and response to help local civil affairs departments in areas such as the provinces of Fujian and Guandong to prepare for relief work. By September 3, the NMC had raised their warning signal to a yellow alert. Total economic losses in South China were counted to be CNY 10 million (US$1.53 million).

Tropical Storm Guchol (Kiko)

On September 3, the JMA started to track a tropical depression that had developed to the east of Luzon, Philippines. During the next day, the PAGASA initiated advisories and gave the local name Kiko, while the JTWC followed suit by giving it the designation 19W. However, due to increased wind shear along with an exposed circulation, the JTWC issued its final advisory on 03:00 UTC September 5. Several hours later, deep convection was depicted and despite moderate to high shear, the JTWC re-initiated advisories, while the JMA had upgraded the system to a tropical storm, naming it as Guchol early on the next day. On 21:00 UTC of that day, the JTWC stopped issuing warnings on the system after convection significantly weakened. JMA later followed suit early on the next day by declaring it a remnant low as it neared Putian, Fujian on Strait of Taiwan.

Typhoon Talim (Lannie)

A tropical depression formed east of Guam on September 7. By the next day, the JTWC began issuing advisories on Tropical Depression 20W. On September 9, 20W organized into a tropical storm, with the JMA naming the system as Talim. With gradual intensification, the JMA upgraded Talim to a severe tropical storm. Talim further strengthened to a typhoon on September 11 where it simultaneously entered the PAR, with PAGASA naming it as Lannie. The JTWC, however, delayed their upgrade until September 12. Talim began to curve eastward as it rapidly weakened to a tropical storm thereafter, making landfall in Kyushu on September 17, with a path of heavy rainfall up to the region east of Tokyo.

In Japan, 5 people were killed, and the agricultural loss were about JP¥32 billion (US$287.9 million). Total damages across the country were counted to be US$750 million.

Typhoon Doksuri (Maring)

As of September 19, the NDRRMC confirmed a total of 8 dead due to landslides and flooding while total damages were up to ₱267 million (US$5.24 million).

On September 15, Typhoon Doksuri made landfall in Quảng Bình Province, Vietnam as a Category 3 typhoon. Doksuri killed 15 people so far in Vietnam while estimated damages were about ₫16.36 trillion (US$720 million). Despite making landfall in Indochina, Doksuri affected Hainan and total economic losses were estimated to be CNY 100 million (US$15.3 million).

Tropical Depression 22W (Nando)

The China Observatory issued a "yellow" alert over in the eastern and southern regions due to rainstorms. Typhoon Signal No. 1 was raised over in Hong Kong during September 24, with expected gusts of up to  including rough swells. A voltage dip also occurred, causing 17 people to be trapped in lifts.

Tropical Depression 23W

Early on October 7, a tropical depression formed to the west of the Philippines.

Tropical Depression 23W caused severe flooding over provinces of Northern and Central Vietnam. Roughly more than 700 houses have been destroyed, while rescue efforts have saved 28 people from the danger zone. In total, 100 people were killed, and damages were about 13 trillion₫ (US$572 million). In Hoàng Long river (Ninh Bình Province) flooding was the most severe since 1985.

Typhoon Khanun (Odette) 

By October 11, the Japan Meteorological Agency upgraded a disturbance that was organizing in the Philippine Sea. By 06:00 UTC on the following day, the Joint Typhoon Warning Center also upgraded the disturbance to a depression, designating it as "24W". By 12:00 UTC the same day, the JMA officially upgraded the depression, naming it as "Khanun". Two hours later, the PAGASA upgraded the depression, naming it "Odette". Over the rest of the day, Khanun intensified under favorable conditions, while approaching the northern parts of Luzon. At 14:00 UTC (10:00 pm PHST), PAGASA upgraded "Odette" to a tropical storm while nearing landfall over Santa Ana, Cagayan. The storm will make landfall on the place, and emerged into the South China Sea, when it started re-intensifying under favorable conditions. At 06:00 UTC, JMA upgraded Khanun into a severe tropical storm; the PAGASA would later follow suit, as "Odette" is also upgraded into a severe tropical storm. At 14:00 UTC (10:00 pm PHST), PAGASA reported that Severe Tropical Storm "Odette" has exited their Philippine Area of Responsibility.

Intensifying in the South China Sea, Khanun was upgraded to a typhoon by the JMA on October 14 at 12:00 UTC. The JTWC would follow suit six hours later, upgrading the storm into a category 1 typhoon. By the next day, JMA reported that Khanun reached its peak intensity with 135 km/h (75 knots) and a pressure of 955 hPa. The JTWC would follow suit three hours later with the winds of 165 km/h (90 knots) and a pressure of 965 hPa. After its peak, Khanun immediately weakened under the influence of the northeast monsoon; at the time the storm made landfall over the Leizhou Peninsula, the system was barely at tropical storm intensity. Both agencies would issue their last advisories on Khanun, as the storm weakened further while approaching the northern Vietnam.

According to the NDRRMC, Khanun killed only one person, with total damages of ₱4.45 million (US$86,600). Authorities in Hong Kong and Macau raised the number 8 tropical cyclone warning on October 15 as gale-force winds affected the region. In total, damages from Khanun in South China were counted to be CNY2.46 billion (US$373 million).

Typhoon Lan (Paolo)

The United States Naval Research Laboratory (NRL) initially mentioned a tropical disturbance over Chuuk on October 11. After the slow consolidation, the Joint Typhoon Warning Center (JTWC) issued a Tropical Cyclone Formation Alert to the elongated system early on October 14, shortly after the Japan Meteorological Agency (JMA) started to monitor it as a low-pressure area. The agency upgraded it to a tropical depression almost one day later and began to issue tropical cyclone warnings since 06:00 UTC on October 15. In the afternoon, the JTWC also upgraded it to a tropical depression assigning the designation 25W, which formative but shallow convective bands had become more organized, and symmetrically wrapped into a defined low-level circulation center. Early on October 16, the JTWC upgraded Lan to a tropical storm too, based on T-number 2.5 of the Dvorak technique, shortly before it entered the Philippine Area of Responsibility and received the name Paolo from PAGASA.

In Japan, 17 people were killed in Mainland Japan and the agricultural loss were about JP¥62.19 billion (US$547.9 million). Total economic losses were counted to be US$2 billion.

Tropical Depression 26W

Originating from an enhanced monsoon trough, a tropical disturbance developed just to the northwest of Palawan on October 17. On October 18, the JTWC had issued a TCFA on the system. By 21:00 UTC of that day, the JTWC began issuing advisories as they classified it as a tropical depression, assigning the identifier 26W. This was due to deep convection found near the storm's center with formative banding, along with its location over in a favorable environment. Initially, its forecast stated that 26W would intensify into a weak tropical storm, although due to a disorganized center with strong shear, the JTWC issued their final advisory on October 19 as it was being absorbed by the outflow of nearby Typhoon Lan.

Associated with the rainbands of a nearby typhoon, 26W helped spread scattered rainfall throughout most of Visayas and northern Mindanao. Residents in some areas were alerted against possible flash floods and landslides. 14 people were dead from heavy rainfall from the system and its precursor, and raised a state of calamity in Zamboanga City on October 23.

Severe Tropical Storm Saola (Quedan)

Tropical Depression 29W

The JMA upgraded a low-pressure area to a tropical depression over the southern portion of the South China Sea, on October 30. The JTWC issued a TCFA during the next day as it gathered strength. Initially forecast to intensify to a tropical storm, the system rapidly deteriorated and degenerated to a remnant low on November 3 as it tracked into the Gulf of Thailand. Over in the course of two days, after re-curving back to the gulf, the JTWC re-issued a TCFA. By November 6, the JTWC classified the system as Tropical Depression 29W. On November 8, 29W made landfall over the Malay Peninsula, before dissipating soon afterward.

Tropical Depression 29W caused unusually heavy rains and flash floods to occur in the state of Penang, killing 7 people. Flood waters in parts of the city reached , submerging entire homes.

Typhoon Damrey (Ramil)

The JMA upgraded a low-pressure area to a tropical depression east of Visayas on October 31. PAGASA gave warnings to the system and named it Ramil. The storm brought rainy weather on the All Saints's Day (November 1) to Visayas. The tropical depression made landfall over Busuanga, Palawan at midnight on November 1. On November 2, Ramil strengthened, and the JTWC and JMA upgraded Ramil to a tropical storm, and gave the system the international name Damrey.

As of November 8, a total of 112 people were confirmed dead due to the storm.

Tropical Storm Haikui (Salome)

No casualties were reported, though damages were totaled up to ₱218.5 million (US$4.26 million). In addition, only five houses were fully damaged in Dipaculao, Aurora.

Tropical Storm Kirogi (Tino)

Total economic losses in Vietnam were amounted to be US$10 million. The remnant energy of Tropical Storm Kirogi eventually contributed to the formation of Very Severe Cyclonic Storm Ockhi in the North Indian Ocean.

Tropical Storm Kai-tak (Urduja)

A low-pressure area developed into a tropical depression east of Mindanao late on December 11, and the JMA began to issue tropical cyclone warnings early on the next day.

The NDRRMC confirmed a total of 83 people dead and calculated a total of ₱3.747 billion (US$74.3 million) worth of infrastructure and agricultural damages.

Typhoon Tembin (Vinta)

Over the next few days, the system moved gradually north-westwards in favourable conditions, before it was reclassified as a tropical depression by the JMA during December 20, while it was located to the northeast of Palau. During that day, the JTWC and PAGASA also classified the system as a tropical depression with the latter naming it as Vinta, before the JMA named the system Tembin as it had developed into a tropical storm.

Rough waves caused by Tembin sank a ferry on December 22, killing five people. An additional 261 people were also killed due to flooding in Mindanao. Estimated damages are around ₱2.1 billion (US$42 million).

Other systems
On March 19, a tropical depression formed close to the northeast of Mindanao, Philippines, and dissipated over the Sibuyan Sea two days later. The system re-curved and started moving in a northeastward direction until it dissipated to the southwest of Tokyo on July 1. During the next day, the JTWC issued a Tropical Cyclone Formation Alert (TCFA) on the system, although it was canceled several hours later. After moving northward, the depression rapidly weakened as it was absorbed by a stationary front on July 7.

The depression moved in a generally northeasterly direction until weakening to a low-pressure area by 06:00 UTC on July 16. After several days, the system had already transitioned into an extratropical cyclone on July 29, without becoming a tropical storm. Early on August 25 the JMA started to track a tropical depression over in the South China Sea, although it was last monitored during the next day when it was absorbed by the outflow of Tropical Storm Pakhar. The JMA predicted that the system would become a tropical storm within the next 24 hours, although because the system did not develop further, the JMA issued their final advisory on 03:00 UTC of August 29 when the system had weakened into a low-pressure area. The remnants of the system helped with formation of Tropical Storm Mawar. On December 29, a weak tropical depression formed south-southwest of Palau. The system later strengthened into Tropical Storm Bolaven during the following year.

Storm names

Within the Northwest Pacific Ocean, both the Japan Meteorological Agency (JMA) and PAGASA assign names to tropical cyclones that develop in the Western Pacific, which can result in a tropical cyclone having two names. PAGASA assigns names to tropical cyclones which move into or form as a tropical depression in their area of responsibility located between 135°E–115°E and between 5°N–25°N even if the cyclone has had an international name assigned to it. The names of significant tropical cyclones are retired, by both PAGASA and the Typhoon Committee. Should the list of names for the Philippine region be exhausted then names will be taken from an auxiliary list of which the first ten are published each season.

International names

The JMA selected the names from a list of 140 names, that had been developed by the 14 members nations and territories of the ESCAP/WMO Typhoon Committee. During the season, the names Hato and Lan were used for the first time (only time in the case of Hato), after they had replaced the names Washi and Vicente, which were retired after the 2011 and 2012 seasons, respectively.

After the season the Typhoon Committee retired the names Hato, Kai-tak and Tembin from the naming lists, and in 2019, they were replaced with Yamaneko, Yun-yeung and Koinu, respectively.

Philippines

During the season PAGASA used its own naming scheme for the 22 tropical cyclones, that either developed within or moved into their self-defined area of responsibility. The names were taken from a list of names, that was last used during the 2013 season and was used again during the 2021 season. All of the names are the same except for Lannie, Salome and Yasmin, which replaced the names Labuyo, Santi and Yolanda after they were retired. The names Lannie and Salome were used for the first time this year.

On December 21, PAGASA announced that it would remove the names Urduja and Vinta from their naming lists after they caused over ₱1 billion in damage. They were replaced with Uwan and Verbena in 2019.

Season effects
This table summarizes all the systems that developed within or moved into the northern Pacific Ocean, to the west of the International Date Line during 2017. The tables also provide an overview of a systems intensity, duration, land areas affected and any deaths or damages associated with the system.
|-
| 01W (Auring) ||  || bgcolor=#| || bgcolor=#| || bgcolor=#| || Philippines, Vietnam, Cambodia ||  ||  || 
|-
| Bising ||  || bgcolor=#| || bgcolor=#| || bgcolor=#| || None ||  None || None ||
|-
| TD ||  || bgcolor=#| || bgcolor=#| || bgcolor=#| || Philippines ||  None || None ||
|-
| 02W (Crising) ||  || bgcolor=#| || bgcolor=#| || bgcolor=#| || Philippines, Taiwan ||  ||  || 
|-
| Muifa (Dante) ||  || bgcolor=#| || bgcolor=#| || bgcolor=#| || None ||  None || None ||
|-
| Merbok ||  || bgcolor=#| || bgcolor=#| || bgcolor=#| || Philippines, South China ||  || None || 
|-
| TD ||  || bgcolor=#| || bgcolor=#| || bgcolor=#| || Japan ||  None || None ||
|-
| Nanmadol (Emong) ||  || bgcolor=#| || bgcolor=#| || bgcolor=#| || Japan ||  ||  || 
|-
| TD ||  || bgcolor=#| || bgcolor=#| || bgcolor=#| || Taiwan, Ryukyu Islands ||  None || None ||
|-
| TD ||  || bgcolor=#| || bgcolor=#| || bgcolor=#| || None ||  None || None ||
|-
| Talas ||  || bgcolor=#| || bgcolor=#| || bgcolor=#| || Hainan, Indochina ||   ||  || 
|-
| Noru ||  || bgcolor=# |  || bgcolor=#| || bgcolor=#| || Japan ||  || 2 || 
|-
| Kulap ||  || bgcolor=#| || bgcolor=#| || bgcolor=#| || None ||  None || None ||
|-
| Sonca ||  || bgcolor=#| || bgcolor=#| || bgcolor=#| || Hainan, Indochina ||  || 37 || 
|-
| Roke (Fabian) ||  || bgcolor=#| || bgcolor=#| || bgcolor=#| || Philippines, Taiwan, South China ||  None || None ||
|-
| Nesat (Gorio) ||  || bgcolor=#| || bgcolor=#| || bgcolor=#| || Philippines, Ryukyu Islands, Taiwan, East China ||  || 3 || 
|-
| TD ||  || bgcolor=#| || bgcolor=#| || bgcolor=#| || None ||  None || None ||
|-
| Haitang (Huaning) ||  || bgcolor=#| || bgcolor=#| || bgcolor=#| || Taiwan, East China ||  || None || 
|-
| Nalgae ||  || bgcolor=#| || bgcolor=#| || bgcolor=#| || None ||  None || None ||
|-
| Banyan ||  || bgcolor=#| || bgcolor=#| || bgcolor=#| || None || None || None ||
|-
| Hato (Isang) ||  || bgcolor=#| || bgcolor=#| || bgcolor=#| || Philippines, Taiwan, South China, Vietnam || || 24 || 
|-
| Pakhar (Jolina) ||  || bgcolor=#| || bgcolor=#| || bgcolor=#| || Philippines, South China, Vietnam, Thailand ||  || 13 || 
|-
| TD ||  || bgcolor=#| || bgcolor=#| || bgcolor=#| || Vietnam ||  None || None ||
|-
| Sanvu ||  || bgcolor=#| || bgcolor=#| || bgcolor=#| || Mariana Islands,  Ogasawara Islands ||  Unknown || 1 || 
|-
| TD ||  || bgcolor=#| || bgcolor=#| || bgcolor=#| || Philippines ||  None || None ||
|-
| Mawar ||  || bgcolor=#| || bgcolor=#| || bgcolor=#| || Philippines, South China ||  || None || 
|-
| Guchol (Kiko) ||  || bgcolor=#| || bgcolor=#| || bgcolor=#| || Philippines, Taiwan, East China ||  None || None ||
|-
| Talim (Lannie) ||  || bgcolor=#| || bgcolor=#| || bgcolor=#| || Mariana Islands, Taiwan, East China, Japan ||  || 5 || 
|-
| Doksuri (Maring) ||  || bgcolor=#| || bgcolor=#| || bgcolor=#| || Philippines, Hainan, Indochina, Bangladesh ||  || 29 ||
|-
| 22W (Nando) ||  || bgcolor=#| || bgcolor=#| || bgcolor=#| || Philippines, South China, Vietnam ||  Minimal || None ||
|-
| 23W ||  || bgcolor=#| || bgcolor=#| || bgcolor=#| || Philippines, Hainan, Indochina ||  || 91 || 
|-
| Khanun (Odette) ||  || bgcolor=#| || bgcolor=#| || bgcolor=#| || Philippines, Taiwan, South China, Vietnam ||  || 1 || 
|-
| Lan (Paolo) ||  || bgcolor=#| || bgcolor=#| || bgcolor=#| || Caroline Islands, Philippines, Japan ||  || 17 || 
|-
| 26W ||  || bgcolor=#| || bgcolor=#| || bgcolor=#| || Philippines || Minimal || 14 || 
|-
| Saola (Quedan)||  || bgcolor=#| || bgcolor=#| || bgcolor=#| || Caroline Islands, Japan ||  || None || 
|-
| 29W ||  || bgcolor=#| || bgcolor=#| || bgcolor=#| || Vietnam, Cambodia, Thailand, Malaysia || Minimal || 7 || 
|-
| Damrey (Ramil) ||  || bgcolor=#| || bgcolor=#| || bgcolor=#| || Philippines, Vietnam, Cambodia ||   || 115 || 
|-
| Haikui (Salome) ||  || bgcolor=#| || bgcolor=#| || bgcolor=#| || Philippines, South China, Vietnam  ||  || None || 
|-
| Kirogi (Tino) ||  || bgcolor=#| || bgcolor=#| || bgcolor=#| || Philippines, Malaysia, Indochina ||  || 8 || 
|-
| Kai-tak (Urduja) ||  || bgcolor=#| || bgcolor=#| || bgcolor=#| || Philippines, Malaysia, Vietnam ||  || 83 || 
|-
| Tembin (Vinta) ||  || bgcolor=#| || bgcolor=#| || bgcolor=#| || Caroline Islands, Philippines, Malaysia, Vietnam ||  || 266 || 
|-

See also

 Weather of 2017
 Tropical cyclones in 2017
 Pacific typhoon season
 2017 Atlantic hurricane season
 2016–17 Australian region cyclone season
 2017–18 Australian region cyclone season
 2017 North Indian Ocean cyclone season
 2017 Pacific hurricane season
 2016–17 South Pacific cyclone season
 2017–18 South Pacific cyclone season
 2016–17 South-West Indian Ocean cyclone season
 2017–18 South-West Indian Ocean cyclone season

Notes

References

External links

 
Articles which contain graphical timelines
Pacific typhoon seasons
2017 WPac